Ireshopeburn (  EYE-sup-burn ) is a village in County Durham, in England. It is situated on the south side of Weardale, between St John's Chapel and Wearhead, and on the other side of the Wear from West Blackdene and New House. In the 2001 census Ireshopeburn had a population of 112.

Burnhope Reservoir lies above the village.

Ireshopeburn is the site of the High House Chapel, the oldest purpose-built Methodist Chapel in the world to have held continuous weekly services since its foundation in 1760. John Wesley himself preached at High House on many occasions.

Ireshopeburn is the site of the Weardale Museum.

Conservation Area 
Three adjacent but historically distinct settlements of Ireshopeburn, Newhouse and the hamlet of West Blackdene were previously covered by two separate conservation area designations but given their shared landscape context and historical links they are being brought together in a unified conservation area in 2011.

References

External links

Weardale Museum website

Villages in County Durham
Stanhope, County Durham